Marguerita Maria "Mady" Christians (January 19, 1892 – October 28, 1951) was an Austrian actress who had a successful acting career in theatre and film in the United States until she was blacklisted during the McCarthy period.

Biography

She was born on January 19, 1892, to Rudolph Christians, a well-known German actor, and his wife, Bertha. Her family moved to Berlin when she was one year old, and to New York City in 1912, where her father became the Irving Place Theatre's general manager. Five years later she returned to Europe to study under Max Reinhardt.

She appeared in several European films before the early 1930s. In 1929, she starred in the first full sound film made in Germany It's You I Have Loved. In 1933, she toured the United States in a play called Marching By and was offered a Broadway contract the following year that allowed her, as several other German artists, to seek refuge from the Nazi regime in the United States.

On Broadway, Christians played Queen Gertrude in Hamlet and Lady Percy in Henry IV, Part I, staged by director Margaret Webster. Webster was part of a small but influential group of lesbian producers, directors, and actors in the theater (a group that included Eva Le Gallienne and Cheryl Crawford). Webster and Christians became close friends.  According to Webster biographer Milly S. Barranger, it is likely that they also were lovers.

She also starred in Lillian Hellman's Watch on the Rhine. She originated the title role in the 1944 play I Remember Mama. Her last movie roles were in All My Sons, based on the play by Arthur Miller, and Letter from an Unknown Woman, both released in 1948.

On February 13, 1949, Christians starred in "Silver Cord", an episode of Ford Television Theatre on CBS. 

During World War II, Christians was involved in political work on behalf of refugees, rights for workers (especially in theater and film), and Russian War relief, political efforts that would bring her to the attention of the Federal Bureau of Investigation (FBI) and other anti-communist institutions and organizations.

Blacklisting
In addition to her political work, Christians publicly criticized the House Committee on Un-American Activities in early 1941 and likened the Senate Internal Security Subcommittee's investigation of propaganda in US film to Nazi harassment of film and radio artists in the 1930s. In 1950, the FBI's internal security division began investigating Christians, who had been identified as a "concealed communist" by a confidential informant. When Christians' name appeared in Red Channels, the so-called bible of the broadcast blacklist, her career was effectively over.

Death
On October 28, 1951, aged 59, Christians died of a cerebral hemorrhage, which some attributed to the stress of being subjected to FBI surveillance and being blacklisted.

Selected filmography

 Audrey (1916) as Evelyn Byrd
 Die Krone von Kerkyra (1917)
 The Lost Paradise (1917) as Edith Bernardi
 Die fremde Frau (1917)
 Am Scheidewege (1918) as Cornelia
 Frau Marias Erlebnis (1918) as Maria - ihre Tochter
 Die Verteidigerin (1918) as Linda Saltarin - Doktor der Rechte
 Die Dreizehn (1918)
 Eine junge Dame von Welt (1918)
  (1918) as Fürstin Tscharkowska
 Am anderen Ufer (1918)
 Fidelio (1919) as Sonja Maderewska - singer
 Die Sühne der Martha Marx (1919) as Mady
 The Peruvian (1919) as Fernades Matamorer
 The Golden Club (1919) as Marga von Olsberg, junge Witwe
 Not und Verbrechen (1919) as Ruth
 Die Nacht des Grauens (1919)
 Die Gesunkenen (1919) as Reta de Lorni
 Der indische Tod (1920) as Inge, Frau von Ralph Leyen
 Indian Revenge (1920)
 Wer unter Euch ohne Sünde ist... (1921)
 Peter Voss, Thief of Millions (1921, part 1–7) as Gert, seine Tochter
 The Fateful Day (1921) as Felicitas / Harriet Steel / Jelena / Marietta
 Today's Children (1922) as Eva
 The Loves of Pharaoh (1922)
 It Illuminates, My Dear (1922) as Jeanne, Marquiße von Chatelet
 A Glass of Water (1923) as Königin Anna
 The Buddenbrooks (1923) as Gerda Arnoldsen
 The Lost Shoe (1923) as Violante
 The Weather Station (1923) as Die Dame
 Finances of the Grand Duke (1924) as Großfürstin Olga von Rußland
 Michael (1924) as Frau (uncredited)
 Debit and Credit (1924) as Baroneß Leonore vin Rothensattel
 Man Against Man (1924)
 Slums of Berlin (1925) as Regine Lossen
 In the Valleys of the Southern Rhine (1925, part 1–2) as Bettina von Wittelsbach
 The Farmer from Texas (1925) as Mabel Bratt
 A Waltz Dream (1925) as Princess Alix
 The Adventurers (1926) as Armely - seine Frau
 Nanette Makes Everything (1926) as Nanette
 Sword and Shield (1926) as Prinzessin Wilhelmine
 The World Wants To Be Deceived (1926) as Sefi - seine Tochter
 The Queen of Moulin Rouge (1926) as Die Herzogin
 The Divorcée (1926) as Gonda van der Loo
 Vienna, How it Cries and Laughs (1926) as Mery, seine Frau
 Out of the Mist (1927) as Lore
 Queen Louise (1927-1928, part 1, 2) as Luise von Mecklenburg, Königin von Preussen
 Grand Hotel (1927)
 Homesick (1927) as Fürstin Lydia Trubezkoj
 The Duel (1927)
 Miss Chauffeur (1928) as Steffi Walker
 A Woman with Style (1928) as Dschilly Bey
 The Burning Heart (1929) as Dorothee Claudius
 The Runaway Princess (1929) as Princess Priscilla
 My Sister and I (1929) as Prinzessin Matgarete von Marquardstein
 It's You I Have Loved (1929) as Inge Lund
 Lieutenant, Were You Once a Hussar? (1930) as Königin Alexandra von Gregorien
 My Heart Incognito (1931) as La reine Alexandra
 The Fate of Renate Langen (1931) as Renate Langen
 The Woman They Talk About (1931) as Vera Moretti
 The Black Hussar (1932) as Marie Luise
 Frederica (1932) as Friederike
 The House of Dora Green (1933) as Dora Green
 The Empress and I (1933) as Empress
 Manolescu, Prince of Thieves (1933) as Comtesse Maria Freyenberg
 The Only Girl (1933) as The Empress
 A Wicked Woman (1934) as Naomi Trice
 Escapade (1935) as Anita
 Ship Cafe (1935) as Countess Boranoff
 Come and Get It (1936) as Karie Linbeck
 Seventh Heaven (1937) as Marie
 The Woman I Love (1937) as Florence
 Heidi (1937) as Dete
 Tender Comrade (1943) as Manya Lodge
 Address Unknown (1944) as Elsa Schulz
 All My Sons (1948) as Kate Keller
 Letter from an Unknown Woman (1948) as Frau Berndle

References

External links

 
 
 Profile Virtual-History.com; accessed February 23, 2015.
 I Dare Say — Variety Spice of Life for Actress

1892 births
1951 deaths
Austrian film actresses
Austrian stage actresses
Hollywood blacklist
Actresses from Vienna
Austrian expatriates in the United States
Austrian expatriates in Germany
20th-century Austrian actresses
People with acquired American citizenship